In Ekker was a series of 13 underground nuclear tests and five atmospheric nuclear tests by France between November 1961 and February 1966. The bombs were detonated at the Oasis Military Experiments Centre near In Ekker, French Algeria at the Tan Afella in the Hoggar Mountains, by the Nuclear Experiments Operational Group (GOEN), a unit of the Joint Special Weapons Command. The series saw the explosion of the first AN-11/21 bombs and was followed by the 1966–1970 series.

Codenames

The 13 underground operations were named after jewel stones, while the 5 AN-11/21 bombs tests were designated as Pollen I, Pollen Rose, Pollen Rouge, Pollen Safran and Pollen Jonquille.

List of tests

See also 

 List of nuclear weapons tests of France
 Nuclear weapons and France
 Force de Frappe
 History of nuclear weapons

Notes

References 

In Ekker
History of the Sahara
Algerian War
Algeria–France relations
1961 in Algeria
1962 in Algeria
1963 in Algeria
1964 in Algeria
1965 in Algeria
1966 in Algeria